Zinc finger protein 737 is a protein that in humans is encoded by the ZNF737 gene.

References

Further reading 

Human proteins